Kiu Tau Wai is a walled village in Ping Shan, Yuen Long District, Hong Kong.

Administration
Kiu Tau Wai is a recognized village under the New Territories Small House Policy. It is one of the 37 villages represented within the Ping Shan Rural Committee.

History
Kiu Tau Wai is one of the three wais (walled villages) and six tsuens (villages) established by the Tang Clan of Ping Shan, namely: Sheung Cheung Wai, Kiu Tau Wai, Fui Sha Wai, Hang Tau Tsuen, Hang Mei Tsuen, Tong Fong Tsuen, San Tsuen, Hung Uk Tsuen, and San Hei Tsuen.

At the time of the 1911 census, the population of Kiu Tau Wai was 152. The number of males was 71.

See also
 Walled villages of Hong Kong
 Ping Shan Heritage Trail

References

External links

 Delineation of area of existing village Kiu Tau Wai (Ping Shan) for election of resident representative (2019 to 2022)
 Antiquities and Monuments Office. Hong Kong Traditional Chinese Architectural Information System. Kiu Tau Wai
 Webpage about Kiu Tau Wai 
 Pictures of Kiu Tau Wai
 Pictures of the Kiu Tau Wai Da Jiu Festival

Walled villages of Hong Kong
Villages in Yuen Long District, Hong Kong
Ping Shan